Wang Xinhui (born 2 January 1993) is a former Chinese professional footballer and currently a football coach.

Club career
Wang started his professional football career in 2011 when he was promoted to Guangdong Youth's squad for the 2011 China League Two campaign. He joined Chinese Super League side Guangzhou R&F in 2013. With high praise of team manager Sven-Göran Eriksson, he was promoted to the first team in December 2013.

Coach career
Wang became the assistant coach of R&F in 2019.

References

External links
 

1993 births
Living people
Chinese footballers
Guangzhou City F.C. players
R&F (Hong Kong) players
Footballers from Meizhou
Chinese Super League players
Hong Kong Premier League players
Association football midfielders